Ciro Cruz Zepeda Peña (3 May 1945 – 12 December 2022) was a Salvadoran politician who served as the leader of the National Coalition Party. He was a deputy for San Salvador in the Legislative Assembly of El Salvador between 1985 and 2012, and served as the President of the Legislative Assembly on three occasions from 2000 to 2001, 2002 to 2006, and 2009 to 2011. On 8 December of the 2011, Cruz Zepeda chaired the plenary legislative while apparently drunk, causing anger among his fellow members of the legislature.

Cruz Zepeda was born in Jutiapa on 3 May 1945. He died on 12 December 2022, at the age of 77.

Political positions 
 President of the Honourable Managerial Board of the Legislative Assembly of the Republic of The Saviour - Period: May 2009 - April 2012
 President of the Parliament Centroamericano (PARLACEN) - Period: October 2007 - October 2008
 Proprietary deputy of the Parliament Centroamericano (PARLACEN) - Period: October 2006 - October 2011
 President of the Honourable Managerial Board of the Legislative Assembly of the Republic of The Saviour - Period: May 2003 - April 2006
 Proprietary deputy of the Parliament Centroamericano (PARLACEN) - Period: October 2001 - October 2006
 President of the Honourable Managerial Board of the Legislative Assembly of the Republic of The Saviour - Period: May 2002 - April 2003
 First Vice-president of the Honourable Managerial Board of the Legislative Assembly of the Republic of The Saviour - Period: May 2001 - April 2002
 President of the Honourable Managerial Board of the Legislative Assembly of the Republic of The Saviour - Period: May 2000 - April 2001
 Proprietary deputy of the Legislative Assembly of the Republic of The Saviour - Period: May 2000 - April 2003
 Proprietary deputy, by the Circunscripción National, in front of the Legislative Assembly of the Republic of The Saviour - Period: May 1997 - April 2000
 Proprietary deputy of the Parliament Centroamericano (PARLACEN) - Period: October 1995 - October 2001
 Secretary of Managerial Board of the PARLACEN, by the Republic of The Saviour - Period: October 1995 - October 1997
 Proprietary deputy of the Parliament Centroamericano (PARLACEN) - Period: October 1991 - October 1996
 Secretary of Managerial Board of the PARLACEN, by the Republic of The Saviour - Period: October 1994 - October 1995
 Vice-president of the Honourable Managerial Board of the Legislative Assembly of the Republic of The Saviour - Period: May 1991 - April 1994
 President of the Court of Accounts of the Republic of The Saviour, charge to the cual elected and reelected by the Legislative Assembly for two consecutive periods - Period: October 1985 - March 1989

References 

1945 births
2022 deaths
Presidents of the Legislative Assembly of El Salvador
Members of the Legislative Assembly of El Salvador
National Coalition Party (El Salvador) politicians
Presidents of Central American Parliament
People from Cabañas Department
20th-century Salvadoran politicians
21st-century Salvadoran politicians